Potomac Mills is an unincorporated community in Westmoreland County, in the U. S. state of Virginia. The post office was established in 1877.

References

External links
GNIS entry

Unincorporated communities in Virginia
Unincorporated communities in Westmoreland County, Virginia